Black theatre or black theater may refer to:

 Black light theatre, a staging concept using black backgrounds and black light
 Black Theatre (Sydney), an Australian Aboriginal theatre company 1972–1977
 African-American musical theater, prominent especially in New York City